El Omaria District is a district of Médéa Province, Algeria.

The district is further divided into 3 municipalities:
El Omaria
Baata
Ouled Brahim

Districts of Médéa Province